The 30 mm Ho-155 cannon was a Japanese aircraft autocannon used during World War II, often mistakenly called with the Ho-105 or Ho-151. A lighter and more compact Ho-155-II was designed towards the end of the war.

Development

The Ho-155-I was first began development in 1942 as a scaled-up and modified version of the 20mm Ho-5 cannon, itself a scaled-up Model 1921 aircraft .50-inch Browning machine gun. In 1943-44 began development of the Ho-155-I and in late 1944 began the development and production of the Ho-155-II for fit into tighter wing bays of fighter planes such as the Ki-84-Ic, Ki-102 and on the project design of the jet-powered Ki-201.

Unknown service
Simultaneously the Ho-155-I and Ho-155-II were produced in Nagoya by the Nagoya Army Arsenal, but as the war was prolonged leading to shortages of materials it is not known how many were eventually produced or how many actually saw service. However it became an example of ingenuity and design from the simple basic design of the Browning machine gun.

References

External links
 Gustin Emmanuel, The WWII Fighter Gun Debate: Gun Tables  (1999)
 Anthony G. Williams, 30 MM CALIBRE CARTRIDGES

30 mm artillery
Autocannon
Aircraft guns
World War II weapons of Japan